Ganjeh (also known as Gandzha, Gunja, and Gūnjeh) is a village in Rostamabad-e Jonubi Rural District, in the Central District of Rudbar County, Gilan Province, Iran. At the 2006 census, its population was 1,196, in 326 families.

References 

Populated places in Rudbar County